Alonzo Todd Washington (born September 2, 1983) is an American politician, appointed to the Maryland Senate in 2023 to represent District 22, which covers Prince George's County. He previously represented the district in the Maryland House of Delegates from 2012 to 2023 after being appointed to the seat by Governor Martin O'Malley.

Early life and career
Washington was born in Washington, D.C. and raised by his mother, Elizabeth Washington. When he was eight years old, he and his five siblings lived in a homeless shelter in College Park, Maryland. He graduated from Laurel High School in Laurel, Maryland. He was a member of both the track and football teams. Washington attended the University of Maryland, College Park, which he attended with help from the First Generation College Bound nonprofit, where he earned a bachelor's degree in criminal justice in 2007. While in college, he played football during his freshman year and was a member of the Alpha Phi Alpha fraternity. Washington is the first person in his family to graduate from both high school and college.

After graduating, Washington worked for the United States Conference of Catholic Bishops as a paralegal. In 2008, he moved to the Prince George's County Council and where he worked as a community liaison and chief of staff to Prince George's County councilmember William A. Campos.

Washington first got involved with politics in 2005 by becoming a member of the Prince George's County Young Democrats association. He was a member of the Prince George's County Democratic Central Committee from 2010 to 2014, serving as its secretary from 2012 to 2014. He has also been a member of the Roosevelt Democratic Club since 2012. After the resignation of Delegate Justin D. Ross, the Prince George's County Democratic Committee recommended Washington to the Governor to fill the vacated seat. Governor Martin O'Malley appointed Washington to fill the seat on December 4, 2012.

In the legislature
Washington was sworn into the Maryland House of Delegates on December 19, 2012.

In 2016, Washington ran for Delegate to the 2016 Democratic National Convention. He was an uncommitted delegate and received 2.0 percent of the vote in the Democratic primary election.

In July 2020, Washington was appointed by Prince George's County executive Angela Alsobrooks to lead a task force to look at reforming the county's police department. The task force presented a list of recommendations in its final report on December 4, 2020, which included repealing the Law Enforcement Officers' Bill of Rights, getting rid of military equipment, and increasing police diversity and county residency; 46 of the plan's 50 recommendations were implemented.

In December 2022, Governor-elect Wes Moore nominated state senator Paul G. Pinsky to serve as the director of the Maryland Energy Administration. Washington filed to fill the vacancy left by Pinsky in the Maryland Senate later that month. On January 21, 2023, the Prince George's County Democratic Central Committee nominated Washington to serve the rest of Pinsky's term. On January 27, Moore appointed Washington to the Maryland Senate.

Committee assignments

Maryland House of Delegates
 Vice-Chair, Ways and Means Committee, 2020–2023 (member, 2013–2023; revenues subcommittee, 2013–2017; chair, election law subcommittee, 2017–2019, member, 2015–2023; chair, education subcommittee, 2020–2023, member, 2013–17; 2020–2023)
 Joint Committee on Children, Youth, and Families, 2015–2023
 Joint Committee on Federal Relations, 2015–2023
 Joint Committee on the Management of Public Funds, 2015–2023
 Rules and Executive Nominations Committee, 2020–2023
 Spending Affordability Committee, 2020–2023
 Deputy Majority Whip, 2015–2018
 Parliamentarian, 2019

Other memberships
 1st Vice-Chair, Prince George's County Delegation, 2018–2023 (chair, law enforcement & state-appointed boards committee, 2015–2016, member, 2013–2016; chair, law enforcement committee, 2017–2018; chair, education committee, 2019)
 Member, Legislative Black Caucus of Maryland, 2013–present (1st vice-chair, 2015–2016)
 Maryland Legislative Latino Caucus, 2019–present
 Maryland Legislative Transit Caucus, 2019–present

Political positions

Alcohol
Washington introduced legislation in the 2017 legislative session that would allow movie theaters to sell alcoholic beverages under certain conditions. The bill received an unfavorable report from the Economic Matters committee.

Education
Washington introduced legislation in the 2015 legislative session that would create a college access pilot program for low-income students. The bill passed and became law on May 12, 2015.

Washington introduced legislation in the 2021 legislative session that would allow students to take a day off once every quarter for mental health reasons. The bill passed the Maryland House of Delegates by a vote of 131-1, but did not receive a vote in the Maryland Senate. He also introduced legislation that would allow teachers to instruct students remotely during the COVID-19 state of emergency if they hadn't been fully vaccinated for COVID-19. The bill passed but was vetoed by Governor Larry Hogan. The legislature voted to override his veto during the 2021 special legislative session.

Elections
Washington introduced legislation during the 2018 legislative session that would require social media companies to make more information about online political ads available to voters. The bill passed and became law on May 26, 2018. In August 2018, news media outlets including The Washington Post and The Baltimore Sun filed a lawsuit challenging the law, arguing that it created unfair burdens on media sites that publish such ads. Hearings for the case began on October 28, 2019.

Washington introduced legislation in the 2021 legislative session that would expand early voting center hours from 7 a.m. to 8 p.m. on each voting day. The bill passed and became law on May 30, 2021.

Healthcare
In 2018, Washington co-sponsored the Healthy Maryland Act, which would establish a single-payer healthcare system in Maryland.

Housing
Washington introduced legislation in the 2019 legislative session that would remove a state requirement that the Glenn Dale Hospital, which closed in 1981, be used as a continuing-care retirement community, potentially allowing for the property to be sold to housing developers. The bill passed and became law on April 18, 2019.

Government
Washington introduced legislation in the 2014 legislative session that would prohibit the Prince George's County Board of Education from issuing credit cards to its members. Afterwards, the Board of Education voted unanimously to ban its members from having county-issued credit cards.

Washington introduced legislation during the 2015 legislative session that would establish an inspector general's office responsible for investigating and examining complaints about public schools.

Washington introduced legislation during the 2021 legislative session that would require the Maryland Senate to approve the governor's nominee for state superintendent. The bill passed the House of Delegates by a vote of 98-40, but did not receive a vote in the Senate.

Policing
Washington introduced legislation in the 2021 legislative session that would expand the required training for school resource officers to include restorative approaches. The bill passed in the House of Delegates by a vote of 93-42, but did not receive a vote in the Senate.

Taxes
Washington introduced legislation in the 2022 legislative session that would exempt diabetic care products from the sales and use tax. The bill passed and became law on April 1, 2022.

Electoral history

References

1983 births
Living people
2012 United States presidential electors
21st-century American politicians
African-American state legislators in Maryland
Maryland Terrapins football players
Democratic Party members of the Maryland House of Delegates
People from Greenbelt, Maryland
University of Maryland, College Park alumni
21st-century African-American politicians
20th-century African-American people